2012 U-League is fifth season for university football teams in South Korea. The participated team is expanded to 72 teams of university football teams in South Korea. League was divided 8 division league, 9 teams in each division league. The top four teams from each division progress to the U-League Championship.

League start on March 30 and will end October.

Changing teams

Dropped teams in 2012
Sunghwa College
Sungmin University
University of Incheon

New teams in 2012
Global Cyber University
Jeju International University – formerly Tamna University
Jeonju Kijeon College
Mokpo Science College
Mun Kyung College
Osan College
Soongsil University

Participating teams

Central 1 Division
 Dongguk University
 Hanmin University
 Hoseo University
 Jeju International University
 Kwandong University
 Pai Chai University
 Seoul National University
 Sungkyunkwan University
 Sunmoon University

Central 2 Division
 Ajou University
 Chung-Ang University
 Chungbuk National University
 Digital Seoul Culture Arts University
 Global Cyber University
 Hongik University
 Konkuk University
 Sangji University
 University of Suwon

Central 3 Division
 Gukje Digital University
 Halla University
 Hanyang University
 Korea University
 Kwangwoon University
 Kyonggi University
 Myongji University
 Osan College
 Yonsei University

Central 4 Division
 Cheongju University
 Dankook University
 Hannam University
 Hanzhung University
 Kyunghee University
 Sejong University
 Songho College
 Soongsil University
 Yong-In University

Honam 1 Division
 Chosun University
 Chunnam Techno College
 Dongkang College
 Gwangju University
 Howon University
 Kunjang College
 Mokpo Science College
 Seonam University
 Woosuk University

Honam 2 Division
 Chodang University
 Chosun College of S&T
 Daebul University
 Dongshin University
 Hanlyo University
 Honam University
 Jeonju University
 Nambu University
 Wonkwang University

Yeongnam 1 Division
 Andong Science College
 Daegu University
 Dong-A University
 Dong-eui University
 Gyeongju University
 Inje University
 International University of Korea
 Mun Kyung College
 Taekyeung College

Yeongnam 2 Division
 Daegu Arts University
 Jeonju Kijeon College
 Kundong University
 Kyungwoon University
 Pukyong National University
 University of Ulsan
 Yeungnam University
 Yewon Arts University
 Youngdong University

League table

Central 1 Div.

Central 2 Div.

Central 3 Div.

Central 4 Div.

Honam 1 Div.

Honam 2 Div.

Yeongnam 1 Div.

Yeongnam 2 Div.

Knockout stage

Round of 32

Group 1

Tiebreakers
Kwangwoon University and Dankook University are ranked by their head-to-head records (as shown below).

Group 2

Group 3

Group 4

Group 5

Tiebreakers
Yewon Arts University and Dong-eui University are ranked by their head-to-head records (as shown below).

Group 6

Group 7

Group 8

Bracket

Winner

References

U-League (association football)